Tagiades litigiosa, the water snow flat, is a butterfly belonging to the family Hesperiidae which is found in India, Sri Lanka, and Myanmar.

Description

The larvae feed on Dioscorea oppositifolia, Dioscorea alata and Smilax species.

Gallery

References

Butterflies of Asia
Tagiades